Čobanija Mosque was constructed in Sarajevo, Bosnia and Herzegovina, before 1565. The building is quite spacious, with a fine stone minaret. Set into the walls around the minaret is a poem in Turkish. There is a cemetery adjacent to the mosque, which some believe is the final resting place of the benefactor, Čoban-Hasan.

In 2007, a proposal was adopted for the mosque to be listed as a national monument of Bosnia and Herzegovina.

See also
 Islam in Bosnia and Herzegovina
 List of mosques in Bosnia and Herzegovina

References 

Mosques in Sarajevo
Religious buildings and structures completed in 1561
Centar, Sarajevo
Attacks on religious buildings and structures during the Bosnian War
Ottoman mosques in Bosnia and Herzegovina
16th-century mosques
1561 establishments in the Ottoman Empire